Gould Arthur Lucas, Irish soldier and survivor of , fl. 1830s – 19 May 1914

Ensign Lucas and Lieutenant Girardot, were on watch together the night of the wreck. Both heard the night orders given to the naval officer of the watch; Lucas was afterwards always under the impression that a small grass fire high on the shore at Danger Point misled this officer into thinking it was the lighthouse at Cape Agulha. Three weeks after the wreck, he posted home "an account of his experience which is of great interest. The narrative written while the circumstances were fresh in its author's memory gives us a vivid picture of the scene on that terrible night in February 1852."

Lucas retired as a captain in 1859, subsequently serving as a magistrate in Durban. Prior to his retirement to England in 1897, he also served as Chief Magistrate at Durban. He was still alive in 1902 but died in 1914.

References

External links
 

Irish sailors in the Royal Navy
People from County Monaghan
19th-century Irish people